Edmund Alexander Lanquaye Bannerman  (22 July 1915 – 27 June 1983) was the Chief Justice of Ghana between 1970 and 1972. He was the fourth person to hold this position since Ghana became an independent nation in 1957. He was removed from office by the National Redemption Council, the military government in power after the coup of 13 January 1972 that ended the Second Republic of Ghana.

Biography
Edmund Lanquaye Bannerman was born in Accra, Gold Coast (now Ghana), on 22 July 1915. His father was Emmanuel Edmund Bannerman, who was an organist and choirmaster of the Wesley Methodist Church in Accra. He was educated at Selwyn College, University of Cambridge, England, and was called to the Bar at Lincoln's Inn, London, in 1939, after which he entered private practice in Ghana.

His later legal career encompassed being a senior lecturer at the Ghana School of Law (1960–64), a visiting lecturer at the University of Ghana (1961–63), a High Court judge in Tanzania (1964–67), legal adviser to Ghana Police and Ghana Airways (1967–70). He became a judge of the Supreme Court of Ghana in 1970, and was appointed Chief Justice of Ghana in 1971, after being acting Chief Justice (1970–71).

Bannerman died in Accra on 27 June 1983, at the age of 67.

See also
List of judges of the Supreme Court of Ghana
Supreme Court of Ghana

References

1915 births
1983 deaths
20th-century Ghanaian judges
Academic staff of Ghana School of Law
Academic staff of the University of Ghana
Members of Lincoln's Inn
Alumni of Selwyn College, Cambridge
People from Accra
Justices of the Supreme Court of Ghana
Ghanaian Methodists